Come Back Peter is a 1952 British comedy film directed by Charles Saunders and starring Patrick Holt, Peter Hammond and Humphrey Lestocq. It was an independent film, released as a second feature.

Cast
 Patrick Holt as John Neilson  
 Peter Hammond as George Harris  
 Humphrey Lestocq as Arthur Hapgood  
 Kathleen Boutall as Mrs. Hapgood  
 Charles Lamb as Mr. Hapgood  
 Pamela Bygrave as Myrna Hapgood  
 Aud Johansen as Virginia  
 Dorothy Primrose as Phyllis Hapgood 
 Doris Groves as Dandy  
 John Singer as Ted
 Joan Hickson as Mrs. Harris 
 Ronnie Stevens as Salesman
 Ian Fleming as Bank Manager

Critical reception
Although TV Guide dismissed the film as an "Unmemorable comedy," Allmovie wrote "Some laughs, some tears, some pretzels, some beers. Come Back Peter went down easily in a brisk 80 minutes."

References

Bibliography
 Chibnall, Steve & McFarlane, Brian. The British 'B' Film. Palgrave MacMillan, 2009.

External links
 

1952 films
British comedy films
1952 comedy films
Films directed by Charles Saunders
British black-and-white films
1950s English-language films
1950s British films